Userin is a municipality in the district Mecklenburgische Seenplatte, in Mecklenburg-Vorpommern, Germany. It belongs to the Seenplatte district of Mecklenburg and is part of the administrative community of Neustrelitz-Land.

The lake Bullowsee is located within the municipality.

References

Grand Duchy of Mecklenburg-Strelitz